Thomas A. "Tom" Tamas (born June 11, 1965) is an American sport shooter.

He was born in Honolulu, Hawaii.  He competed for the United States in the 2000 Summer Olympics, in the Men's Small-Bore Rifle, Prone, 50, coming in tied for 13th.  He shares the world record in the 50 meter rifle prone competition.

Current world record in 50 m rifle prone

References

1965 births
Living people
American male sport shooters
Olympic shooters of the United States
Shooters at the 2000 Summer Olympics
Shooters at the 2007 Pan American Games
People from Honolulu
Sportspeople from Hawaii
Pan American Games medalists in shooting
Pan American Games gold medalists for the United States
Medalists at the 2007 Pan American Games